Alexandre Dujeux (born 8 January 1976) is a French professional football coach and a former defender. He is an assistant coach with Angers.

References

External links

1976 births
Living people
Sportspeople from Ardennes (department)
Association football defenders
French footballers
Ligue 1 players
Ligue 2 players
Red Star F.C. players
LB Châteauroux players
Le Havre AC players
ES Troyes AC players
AC Ajaccio players
Tours FC players
Footballers from Grand Est